Munyal is a village in Mudalgi Talluk I.e. Belagavi district of Karnataka, India.

References

Villages in Belagavi district